De Villota is a surname. Notable people with the surname include:

Emilio de Villota (born 1946), Spanish racing driver
Emilio de Villota Jr. (born 1981), Spanish racing driver
María de Villota (1980−2013), Spanish racing driver

See also
 Villota (disambiguation)